The 1997 Karl Schäfer Memorial (also known as the Vienna Cup) took place from 15 to 18 October 1997. Skaters competed in the disciplines of men's singles, ladies' singles, and ice dancing.

It was used as a qualifying event for the upcoming 1998 Winter Olympics in Nagano, Japan.

Results

Men

Ladies
Chen Lu qualified China for the 1998 Olympics in the ladies' competition after losing China's spot with her poor 1997 World Figure skating championship performance. Chen performed 4 triple jumps including the triple loop.

Pairs

Ice dancing

References

External links
 1997 Karl Schäfer Memorial 

Karl Schäfer Memorial
Karl Schafer Memorial, 1997
Karl Schafer Memorial